"The Monkey Wrench" is a science fiction short story by American writer Gordon R. Dickson.

Plot summary
In this story, Lowland society lawyer Cary Harmon drops in unannounced on the weather station of meteorologist Burke McIntyre, high in the Lonesome Mountains, a jagged chain of the deserted shorelands of Venus's Northern Sea. Curious about Burke's hermit's existence, Cary queries to gain knowledge of how Burke works. The Brain, a newly installed computer, does all observations, and Burke, by himself, just sits at the desk and prepares weather data for transmission to the Weather Center down at the Capital City.

Cary tries to find fault in the machine, but Burke proudly argues that the Brain, "A big tin god", is invulnerable, that it can never break down. Along the debate, Burke claims that any bank out of the twenty could handle any situation, and if a situation too big for one to handle arose, it just hooked in with one or more of the idle banks until it was capable of dealing with the situation.

Despite that, Cary happily makes a bet that he could gimmick the machine in one minute. He successfully does so by throwing at the machine a metaphoric monkey wrench - a paradox:

With the Brain dedicating all of its banks to working on the paradox, the consequence of Cary's action finally bears down upon the pair, as the harsh negative temperatures of Venus rapidly sets in.

External links 
 

1951 short stories
Short stories by Gordon R. Dickson
Works originally published in Analog Science Fiction and Fact